This is a list of television shows based on comics.

DC and Marvel

As so many DC and Marvel comic books have been adapted into television shows, they have separate entries:
 List of television series based on DC Comics
 List of unproduced DC Comics projects
 List of television series based on Marvel Comics
 List of unproduced television projects based on Marvel Comics

Independents
 List of television series and films based on Archie Comics
 List of television series and films based on Boom! Studios publications
 List of television series based on Dark Horse Comics
 List of unproduced Dark Horse Comics projects
 List of television series and films based on Harvey Comics publications
 List of television series and films based on IDW Publishing publications
 List of television series and films based on Image Comics
 List of unproduced Image Comics projects
 List of television series and films based on Oni Press publications
 List of TV series based on French-language comics
 List of television series based on comic strips

Live-action
 Agua Bendita (Philippines, 2010)
 All of Us Are Dead (South Korea, 2022)
 American Born Chinese (2023)
 Andres de Saya (Philippines, 2011)
 Ang Babaeng Hinugot sa Aking Tadyang (Philippines, 2009)
 Ang Panday (Philippines, 2005–2006)
 Ang Panday (Philippines, 2016)
 Asphalt Man (South Korea, 1995)
 Avengers Social Club (South Korea, 2017)
 Amanza (South Korea, 2020)
 Backstreet Rookie (South Korea, 2020)
 Bakekang (Philippines, 2006–2007)
 Basahang Ginto (Philippines, 2010)
 Bel Ami (South Korea, 2013–2014)
 Bewegte Männer (Germany, 2003–2005)
 Big Thing (South Korea, 2010)
 The Blood Sword (Hong Kong, 1990)
 The Blood Sword 2 (Hong Kong, 1991)
 The Boys (TV series) (2019–present)
 Blusang Itim (Philippines, 2011)
 Bridal Mask (South Korea, 2012)
 The Bride of Habaek (South Korea, 2017)
 Bring It On, Ghost (South Korea, 2020)
 El botones Sacarino (Spain, 2000-2001)
 Business Proposal (South Korea, 2022)
 Captain Barbell (Philippines, 2006–2007)
 Captain Barbell (Philippines, 2011)
 Chacha Chaudhary (India, 2002)
 Cheese in the Trap (South Korea, 2016)
 Clean with Passion for Now (South Korea, 2018–2019)
 Click (Italy, 1997)
 Cursed (2020)
 Cybersix (Argentina, 1995)
 Darna (Philippines, 2005)
 Darna (Philippines, 2009–2010)
 Daybreak (2019)
 D.P. (South Korea, 2021)
 Dinner Mate (South Korea, 2020)
 Dr. Frost (South Korea, 2014–2015)
 Dyesebel (Philippines, 2008)
 Dyesebel (Philippines, 2014)
 The End of the F***ing World (United Kingdom, 2017–2019)
 Eva & Adam (Sweden, 1999–2001)
 Extraordinary You (South Korea, 2019)
 Feel Good to Die (South Korea, 2018)
 Full House (South Korea, 2004)
 Full House Take 2 (South Korea, 2012)
 La Fortuna (Spain, 2021)
 Gagambino (Philippines, 2008–2009)
 Galema: Anak ni Zuma (Philippines, 2013–2014)
 Gangnam Beauty (South Korea, 2018)
 ¡García! (Spain, 2022–present)
 A Girl Who Sees Smells (South Korea, 2015)
 Gourmet (South Korea, 2008)
 Harsh Realm (1999–2000)
 Heartstopper (2022–present)
 Hell Is Other People (South Korea, 2019)
 Hellbound (South Korea, 2021)
 Hogu's Love (South Korea, 2015)
 Hope: Kitai Zero no Shinnyu Shain (Japan, 2016)
 How to Be Thirty (South Korea, 2021)
 How to Buy a Friend (South Korea, 2020)
 Hyde Jekyll, Me (South Korea, 2015)
 I Am Not Okay with This (2020)
 Imitation (South Korea, 2021)
 Inday Bote (Philippines, 2015)
 Inspiring Generation (South Korea, 2014)
 Itaewon Class (South Korea, 2020)
 Item (South Korea, 2019)
 Joaquin Bordado (Philippines, 2008)
 Kambal sa Uma (Philippines, 2009)
 Kamandag (Philippines, 2007–2008)
 Kingdom (South Korea, 2019–present)
 King of Ambition (South Korea, 2013)
 The King of Blaze (China, 2018)
 The King's Affection (South Korea, 2021)
 Kiss Sixth Sense (South Korea, 2022)
 Kokak (Philippines, 2011–2012)
 Komiks (Philippines, 2006–2009)
 Komiks Presents: Dragonna (Philippines, 2008–2009)
 Komiks Presents: Flash Bomba (Philippines, 2009)
 Komiks Presents: Kapitan Boom (Philippines, 2009)
 Komiks Presents: Tiny Tony (Philippines, 2008)
 Komiks Presents: Varga (Philippines, 2008)
 Last (South Korea, 2015)
 Lastikman (Philippines, 2007–2008)
 The Legend of Hero (Taiwan, 2005)
 Love Alarm (South Korea, 2019–2021)
 The Love of Hypnosis (China, TBA)
 Love Revolution (South Korea, 2020)
 Lucky Romance (South Korea, 2016)
 MADtv (1995–2009, 2016)
 A Man Called God (South Korea, 2010)
 Meloholic (South Korea, 2017)
 Memorist (South Korea, 2020)
 The Middleman (2008)
 Momay (Philippines, 2010)
 Moving In (South Korea, 2022)
 My Cute Guys (South Korea, 2013)
 My First Love (South Korea, 2018)
 My Lawyer, Mr. Jo (South Korea, 2016)
 My Lawyer, Mr. Jo 2: Crime and Punishment (South Korea, 2019)
 Mystic Pop-up Bar (South Korea, 2020)
 Navillera (South Korea, 2021)
 The Neighbor (Spain, 2019–2021)
 Neverthelss (South Korea, 2021)
 No, Thank You (South Korea, 2020–2021)
 Ninja Turtles: The Next Mutation (1997–1998)
 Ninjak vs. the Valiant Universe (2018)
 O Doutrinador: A Série (Brazil, 2019)
 Orange Marmalade (South Korea, 2015)
 Painkiller Jane (2007)
 Blusang Itim (Philippines, 2011)
 Pegasus Market (South Korea, 2019)
 El Pantera (Mexico, 2007)
 El pecado de Oyuki (Mexico, 1988)
 Perversions of Science (1997)
 Phoo Action (UK, 2008)
 Princess Hours (South Korea, 2006)
 Queen's (South Korea, 2007)
 Raising Dion (2019–2022)
 Riding High (1995–1996)
 Rod Santiago's The Sisters (Philippines, 2011)
 Rubí (Mexico, 2004)
 Rugal (South Korea, 2020)
 Sable (1987)
 Save Me (South Korea, 2017)
 The Scholar Who Walks the Night (South Korea, 2010)
 School Spirits (2023)
 Secrets of the Cryptkeeper's Haunted House (1996–1997)
 Sheena, Queen of the Jungle (1955–1956)
 Sheena (2000–2002)
 Sinasamba Kita (Philippines, 2007)
 Songgot: The Piercer (South Korea, 2015)
 The Sound of Magic (South Korea, 2022)
 The Sound of Your Heart (South Korea, 2016)
 Summer's Desire (China, 2010)
 Super Daddy Yeol (South Korea, 2016)
 Sweet Combat (South Korea, 2018)
 Sweet Home (South Korea, 2020)
 Sweet Stranger and Me (South Korea, 2016)
 Tale of Fairy (South Korea, 2018)
 The Tale of Nokdu (South Korea, 2019)
 Tales from the Crypt (1989–1996)
 Taxi Driver (South Korea, 2021)
 Tazza (South Korea, 2008)
 Terry and the Gunrunners (New Zealand, 1985)
 Tomorrow (South Korea, 2022)
 Turn Left Turn Right (Thailand, 2020)
 The Tick (2001–2002)
 The Tick (2016–2019)
 Totoy Bato (Philippines, 2009)
 True Beauty (South Korea, 2020–2021)
 Um Menino Muito Maluquinho (Brazil, 2006)
 The Uncanny Counter (South Korea, 2020–2021)
 Vagrant Queen (2020)
 Valentina (Italy, 1989)
 Van Helsing (2016–2021)
 Walang Kapalit (Philippines, 2007)
 War of Money (South Korea, 2007)
 Warrior Nun (2020–2022)
 We Broke Up (South Korea, 2015)
 Weird Science (1994–1998)
 Welcome (South Korea, 2020)
 Wind and Cloud (Taiwan, 2002)
 Wind and Cloud 2 (Taiwan, 2004)
 Woke (2020–2022)
 Work Later, Drink Now (South Korea, 2021)
 Your House Helper (South Korea, 2018)
 Yumi's Cells (South Korea, 2021)

Animated
 The Adventures of Sam & Max: Freelance Police (1997–1998)
 Angel's Friends (Italy, 2009–2010)
 Billy the Fish (UK, 1990)
 Blokhedz (2009)
 The Boys Presents: Diabolical (2022)
 Bucky O'Hare and the Toad Wars (1991)
 Cadillacs and Dinosaurs (1993–1994)
 Cannon Busters (2019)
 Captain Pugwash (UK, 1957–1975, 1997)
 Captain Star (1997–1998)
 Chacha Bhatija (2016–2017)
 Chacha Chaudhary (2019)
 Chōyū Sekai (China, 2017)
 Cleopatra in Space (2020–present)
 Cocco Bill (Italy, 2001–2004)
 Cybersix (Argentina, 1999)
 Dan Dare: Pilot of the Future (UK, 2002)
 Dead End: Paranormal Park (2021–2022)
 The Deep (2015–present)
 Dennis the Menace (UK):
 Dennis the Menace & Gnasher (1996–1998)
 Dennis the Menace & Gnasher (2009–2013)
 Dennis & Gnasher: Unleashed! (2017–present)
 Diabolik (Italy, 2000–2001)
 DuckTales (1987–1990) (note: many episodes are based on comics by Carl Barks, while the character of Donald Duck which pre-date the comics).
 DuckTales (2017–present)
 Evil or Live (China, 2017–2018)
 The Freak Brothers (2021)
 Fangbone! (2016–2017)
 The Fat Slags (UK, 2004)
 Fish Police (1992)
 Fix & Foxi and Friends (Germany, 2000)
  (Argentina, 2014)
 The God of High School (South Korea, 2020)
 Hilda (2018–present)
 Il mondo di Stefi (Italy, 2008)
 John Callahan's Quads! (2001–2002)
 Kagagi (2014)
 Kampung Boy (Malaysia, 1999–2000)
 Kayko and Kokosh (Poland, 2021–present)
 Kipo and the Age of Wonderbeasts (2020)
 The Last Kids on Earth (2019–present)
 Lookism (South Korea, 2022)
 Lupo Alberto (Italy, 1997–2002)
 Martin Mystery (Italy, 2003–2005)
 Monica's Gang (Brazil, 1976–present)
 Monica Toy (Brazil, 2013–present)
 Monster Allergy (Italy, 2005–2009)
  (Spain, 1966–1971)
  (Spain, 1995)
 Mot (Spain/France, 1996–1997)
 Motu Patlu (2012–present)
 Muggy-Doo, Boy Fox (1965–1966)
 Noblesse (South Korea, 2020)
 The Nutty Boy (Brazil, 2022)
 Pelswick (2000–2002)
 The Rocketeer (2019)
 Roger Mellie (UK, 1991)
 Scary Larry (2010)
 School Shock (China, 2015)
 Sid the Sexist (UK, 1992)
 A Simple Thinking About Blood Type (South Korea, 2013)
 Snake 'n' Bacon (2009)
 Spiff and Hercules (France, 1989)
 Supa Strikas (2008–2015)
 Superhero Kindergarten (2021–present)
 Tai Chi Chasers (2007–2008)
 Tales from the Cryptkeeper (1993–1994)
 Tear Along the Dotted Line  (Italy, 2021)
 Teenage Mutant Ninja Turtles:
 Teenage Mutant Ninja Turtles (1987–1996)
 Teenage Mutant Ninja Turtles (2003–2009)
 Teenage Mutant Ninja Turtles (2012–2017)
 Rise of the Teenage Mutant Ninja Turtles (2018–present)
 The Tick (1994–1996)
 Tower of God (South Korea, 2020)
 Trese (Singapore, 2021)
 Uchūsen Sagittarius (Japan/Italy, 1986–1987)
 Ultramarine Magmell (Japan/China, 2019)
 Virtual Hero (Spain, 2018-2020) 
 Wanderings of Sanmao (2006–present)
Welcome to Eltingville (2002)
 Wendy (Germany, 2013)
 W.I.T.C.H. (Italy, 2004–2006)
 We Bare Bears (2015–present)
 World of Quest (2008–2009)
  (Spain, 2003)

Series based on Manga
Manga are comics created in Japan.

Live-Action
 Alice in Borderland (2020)
 Android Kikaider (1972–1973)
 Angel Heart (2015)
 Arakawa Under the Bridge (2011)
 Attack on Titan: Counter Rockets (2015)
 Be-Bop High School (2004–2005)
 Blazing Transfer Students (2017)
 Case Closed (2006–2012)
 City Hunter (2002)
 Cowboy Bebop (2021)
 Cutie Honey: The Live (2007–2008)
 Death Note (2015)
 Eko Eko Azarak (1997)
 Eko Eko Azarak -eye- (2004)
 Erased (2017)
 Giant Robo (1967–1968)
 Gokusen (2002)
 Great Teacher Onizuka (1998–2014)
 Hell Teacher Nube (2014)
 It Started with a Kiss (2005–2006)
 Kakegurui (2018–2019)
 Kantaro: The Sweet Tooth Salaryman (2019)
 Keep Your Hands Off Eizouken (2020)
 Kikaider 01 (1973–1974)
 Komi Can't Communicate (2021–present)
 Kotaro Lives Alone (2021)
 Late Night Restaurant (2015)
 Lone Wolf and Cub (1973–1976)
 Lone Wolf and Cub (Kozure Okami) (2002–2004)
 Marmalade Boy (2001–2002)
 Meteor Garden (2001)
 Meteor Garden (2018)
 Mighty Atom (1959–1960)
 Midnight Diner (2009–2019)
 Midnight Diner (2017)
 Million Yen Women (2017)
 Mischievous Kiss: Love in Tokyo (2013)
 Mob Psycho 100 (2018)
 MPD Psycho (Japan, 2000)
 One Piece (TBA)
 Ouran High School Host Club (2011)
 Playful Kiss (2010)
 The Prince of Tennis (2019)
 Prison School (2015)
 Samurai Gourmet (2017)
 Scum's Wish (2017)
 Sexy Voice and Robo (2007)
 Smoking Gun (2014)
 Sukeban Deka (1985–1987)
 Take My Brother Away (2018)
 They Kiss Again (2007–2008)
 Vampire Host (2004)
 The Way of the Househusband (2020)
 Wild 7 (1972–1973)
 You're Under Arrest (2002)
 Yowamushi Pedal (2016)
 Zetai Karesh (2008)

Animated
 21 Emon (1991—1992)
 7 Seeds (2019)
 A Certain Scientific Railgun (2009–2010)
 After School Dice Club (2019–present)
 After the Rain (2018)
 Afro Samurai (2007)
 Ajin: Demi-Human (2016)
 Ai Yori Aoshi (2003)
 Aim for the Ace! (1973–1974)
 Air Gear (2006)
 Air Master (2003)
 Akame ga Kill! (2014)
 Akane-chan (1968)
 Akazukin Chacha (1994—1995)
 Akuma-kun (1989—1990)
 Altair: A Record of Battles (2017)
 The Amazing 3 (1965—1966)
 Android Kikaider: The Animation (2000–2001)
 Angel Heart (2001-2010)
 Anmitsu Hime: From Amakara Castle (1986—1987)
 Anonymous Noise (2017)
 Arakawa Under the Bridge (2010)
 Area 88 (2004)
 Arte (2020–present)
 Armed Girl's Machiavellism (2017)
 Asari-chan (1982—1983)
 Ask Dr. Rin! (2001—2002)
 Assassination Classroom (2015–2016)
 Astro Boy (1963–1966)
 Astro Boy (1980–1981)
 Astro Boy (2003–2004)
 Astro Fighter Sunred (2008–2009)
 Attack No. 1 (1969–1971)
 Attack on Titan (2013–present)
 Attack on Titan: Junior High (2015)
 Attacker You! (1984—1985)
 Atom: The Beginning (2017)
 Azuki-chan (1995—1998)
 Babel II
 Babel II (1973)
 Babel II: Beyond Infinity (2001)
 Baby & Me (1996—1997)
 Back Street Girls (2018)
 Baki the Grappler (2001)
 Baki the Grappler (2018–present)
 Baki Hanma (2021)
 Bakusō Kyōdai Let's & Go!! (1996—1998)
 Barakamon (2014)
 Bastard!! (1992–1993)
 Bastard!! (2022)
 Battle B-Daman (2004)
 Battle B-Daman: Fire Spirits! (2005)
 Beastars (2019)
 Be-Bop High School (1990–1995)
 Beelzebub (2011—2012)
 Berserk (1997–1998)
 Berserk (2016—2017)
 Beyblade (2001—2019)
 Big X (1964—1965)
 Black Butler (2008—2010, 2014)
 Black Clover (2017—present)
 Black Jack
 Black Jack (2004—2005)
 Black Jack 21 (2006)
 Black Lagoon (2006)
 Blade of the Immortal (2008)
 Blade of the Immortal -Immortal (2019—present)
 Blast of Tempest (2012—2013)
 Bleach
 Bleach (2004–2012)
 Bleach: Thousand-Year Blood War (2022–present)
 Blood Blockade Battlefront (2017)
 Blood Lad (2013)
 Blue Exorcist (2017)
 Blue Seed (1994–1995)
 Blue Period (2021)
 Boarding School Juliet (2018)
 Bobobo-bo Bo-Bobo (2003–2005)
 Bonobono
 Bonobono (1995—1996)
 Bonobono (2016—present)
 Boruto: Naruto Next Generations (2017—present)
 Bow: Modern Dog Tales (1993—1994)
 Boys Over Flowers (1996—1997)
 Bungo Stray Dogs (2016—2019)
 The Burning Wild Man (1988)
 Cagaster of an Insect Cage (2020)
 The Candidate for Goddess (2000)
 Candy Candy (1976—1979)
 Capeta (2005—2006)
 Captain (1983)
 Captain Tsubasa
 Captain Tsubasa (1983—1986)
 Captain Tsubasa J (1994—1995)
 Captain Tsubasa: Road to 2002 (2001—2002)
 Captain Tsubasa (2018—2019)
 Cardcaptor Sakura (1998–2000)
 Case Closed (1996–present)
 Castle Town Dandelion (2015)
 Cat's Eye (1983–1984, 1984–1985)
 Cells at Work (2019–present)
 Ceres, Celestial Legend (2000)
 Chainsaw Man (2022–present)
 Chibi Maruko-chan (1990—1992)
 Chibi Maruko-chan (1995—present)
 Chihayafuru (2011—2020)
 Chikkun Takkun (1984)
 Children of the Whales (2017)
 Chimpui (1989—1991)
 Chokkaku, the Stubborn Samurai Boy (1991)
 Chrono Crusade (2003–2004)
 The Chronicles of Kamui the Ninja (1969)
 Chronicles of the Going Home Club (2013)
 Chūka Ichiban!
 Chūka Ichiban! (1997—1998)
 Shin Chūka Ichiban! (2019—2021)
 Citrus (2018)
 City Hunter (1987–1991)
 Clamp School Detectives (1997)
 Claymore (2007)
 Clean Freak! Aoyama-kun (2017)
 Cobra the Animation (2010)
 Code:Breaker (2012)
 Colorful (1999)
 Cooking Papa (1992—1995)
 Coppelion (2013)
 Crayon Shin-chan (1992–present)
 Crayon Shin-chan Spin-off (2016–present)
 Croket! (2003—2005)
 Cromartie High School (2003–2004)
 Cutie Honey 
 Cutie Honey (1973–1974)
 Cutie Honey Flash (1997—1998)
 Cutie Honey Universe (2018)
 Cyborg 009 (1968)
 Cyborg 009 (1979–1980)
 Cyborg 009 (2001–2002)
 Cyborg 009 VS Devilman (2015–2016)
 Daily Lives of High School Boys (2012)
 Dame Oyaji (1974)
 Darwin's Game (2020)
 Dash! Yonkuro (1989—1990)
 Deadman Wonderland (2011)
 Dear Brother (1991—1992)
 Death Note (2006–2007)
 The Demon Girl Next Door (2019—2022)
 Demon Lord Dante (2002)
 Demon Slayer: Kimetsu no Yaiba (2019–present)
 Descendants of Darkness (2000)
 Detective School Q (2003—2004)
 Devilman (1972–1973)
 Devilman Crybaby (2018)
 Devil Lady (1998–1999)
 D.Gray-man (2006–2009)
 Di Gi Charat (1998—1999)
 Dimension W (2011–present)
 DNA² (1994–1995)
 Dokaben (1976—1979)
 Dokkiri Doctor (1998—1999)
 Don Dracula (1982)
 Doraemon (1973)
 Doraemon (1979-2005)
 Doraemon (2005–present)
 Dorohedoro (2020)
 Dororo (1969)
 Dororo (2019)
 Dororon Enma-kun
 Dororon Enma-kun (1973—1974)
 Dororon Enma-kun MeeraMera (2011)
 Dr. Slump (1997–1999)
 Dr. Stone (2019–present)
 Dragon Ball
 Dragon Ball (1986–1989)
 Dragon Ball Z (1989–1996)
 Dragon Ball GT (1996–1997)
 Dragon Ball Super (2015–2018)
 Dragon Half (1993)
 Dragon Quest: The Adventure of Dai (1991–1992)
 Dragon Quest: The Adventure of Dai (2020–present)
 Dream Soldier Wing-Man (1984—1985) 
 Drifters (2009–present)
 Drifting Dragons (2020)
 Dropkick on My Devil! (2018–2020)
 Duel Masters (2001–2011)
 Durarara! (2010–2016)
 Eat-Man (1997–1998)
 Edens Zero (2021–present)
 Eiken (2003–2004)
 Elfen Lied (2004)
 Erased (2016)
 Eyeshield 21 (2005–2008)
 Fairy Tal (2009–present)
 Fighting Foodons (2001-2002)
 Fire Force (2019–present)
 First Human Giatrus (1974–1976, 1996–1997)
 Fisherman Sanpei (1980—1982)
 Fist of the North Star (1987–1988)
 Flame of Recca (1997–1998)
 Food Wars!: Shokugeki no Soma (2015–present)
 Forest of Piano (2018–2019)
 Fruits Basket (2001)
 Fruits Basket (2009–present)
 Fujimaru of the Wind (1964—1965)
 Fullmetal Alchemist
 Fullmetal Alchemist (2003–2004)
 Fullmetal Alchemist: Brotherhood (2009–2010)
 Fushigi Yûgi (1995–1996, 1996–1998, 2001–2002)
 Gaki Deka (1989–1990)
 Galaxy Express 999 (1978—1981)
 Gallery Fake (2005)
 Gambalist! Shun (1996—1997)
 Game Center Arashi (1982)
 Ganbare Genki (1980—1981)
 Ganbare, Kickers! (1986—1987)
 Gangsta (2015)
 GeGeGe no Kitarō (1968—1969, 1971—1972, 1985—1988, 1996—1998, 2007—2009, 2008, 2018—2020)
 Genshi Shonen Ryu (1971—1972)
 GetBackers (2002–2003)
 Getter Robo
Getter Robo (1974–1975)
New Getter Robo (2004)
 Ghost in the Shell
 Ghost in the Shell: Stand Alone Complex (2002—2005)
 Ghost in the Shell: Arise (2015)
 Ghost in the Shell: SAC_2045 (2020—present)
Ghost Slayers Ayashi (2006—2007)
 Ghost Sweeper Mikami (1993–1994)
 Giant Robo
 Giant Robo: The Day the Earth Stood Still
 GR: Giant Robo (2007)
 Gigantor (1963–1966)
 Girls' Last Tour (2017)
 Gin Tama (2006–2018)
 The Gokusen (2004)
 Glass Mask (1984, 2005—2006)
 Goldfish Warning! (1991—1992)
 Golgo 13 (2008–2009)
 Gon (2012–2015)
 Gokusen (2004)
 Grand Blue Dreaming (2020)
 Grander Musashi
 Grander Musashi (199/)
 Grander Musashi RV (1998)
 Great Teacher Onizuka (1999–2000)
 G-Taste (1999–2003)
 Gu Gu Ganmo (1984–1985)
 The Gutsy Frog (1972–1974)
 Guyver: The Bioboosted Armor (2005–2006)
 Haikara-San: Here Comes Miss Modern (1978—1979)
 Haikyu (2014–present)
 Hajime no Ippo
 Hajime no Ippo: The Fighting! (2000−2002)
 Hajime no Ippo: New Challenger (2009)
 Hajime no Ippo: Rising (2013−2014)
 Hamtaro (2003–2013)
 Haō Taikei Ryū Knight (1994—1995)
 Happy Sugar Life (2018)
 Hareluya II Boy (1997)
 Harlock Saga (1998–1999)
 Harris no Kaze (1966–1967)
 Hellsing (2001–2002)
 Hellsing: Ultimate (2006–2012)
 Hell Teacher Nube (1996–1997)
 Heroman (2010)
 Hetalia: Axis Powers (2009–2011)
 Hiatari Ryōkō! (1987—1988)
 Hidamari no Ki (2000)
 High-Rise Invasion (2021)
 High School! Kimengumi (1985—1987)
 High School Mystery: Gakuen Nanafushigi (1991—1992)
 High Score Girl (2019–present)
 Highschool of the Dead (2010)
 Hikari no Densetsu (1986)
 Hikaru no Go (2001–2003)
 Hime-chan's Ribbon (1992—1993)
 Himitsu no Akko-chan (1969—1970, 1988—1989, 1998—1999)
 Himouto! Umaru-chan (2015–2017)
 Hitorijime My Hero (2017)
 Honey Honey no Suteki na Bouken (1981—1982)
 Horimiya (2021–present)
 Hori-san Miyamura-kun (2012–2018)
 Hunter × Hunter
 Hunter × Hunter (1999–2001)
 Hunter × Hunter (2011—2014)
 Hyper Police (1997)
 Idaten Jump (2005–2006)
 Igano Kabamaru (1983—1984)
 Ikki Tousen (2003)
 Ikki Tousen (2007)
 Ikki Tousen (2008)
 Ikki Tousen (2010)
 Ikkyū-san (1978)
 Inakappe Taishō (1970–1972)
 Inuyasha (2000–2004)
 Inuyasha: The Final Act (2009–2010)
 Inuyashiki (2017)
 Ironfist Chinmi (1988)
 Itazura na Kiss (1990-1999)
 Jarinko Chie (1981–1983)
 JoJo's Bizarre Adventure (2012–present)
 Juden Chan (2009)
 Jujutsu Kaisen (2020–2021)
 Jungle King Tar-chan (1993—1994)
 The Kabocha Wine (1982–1984)
 Kakegurui (2017–2019)
 Kakegurui Twin (2022)
 Karakuri Circus (2018–2019)
 Karate Master (1971-1977)
 Keep Your Hands Off Eizouken! (2020)
 Kekkaishi (2006–2008)
 Kemono Michi: Rise Up (2019–present)
 Kengan Ashura (2019)
 Kenichi: The Mightiest Disciple (2006–2014)
 Kero Kero Chime (1997)
 Kick no Oni (1970—1971)
 Kiko-chan's Smile (1996—1997)
 Killing Bites (2018)
 Kimagure Orange Road (1987—1988)
 Kimba the White Lion (1965–1966)
 Kinnikuman (1983—1986) 
 The Kindaichi Case Files
 The Kindaichi Case Files (1997—2000)
 The Kindaichi Case Files R (2014—2016)
 Kiteretsu Daihyakka (1988—1996)
 Kobato (2009–2010)
 KochiKame (1996—2004, 2005—2016)
 Kodocha (1996—1998)
 Kokkoku (2018)
 Komi Can't Communicate (2021)
 Kobo, the Li'l Rascal (1992—1994)
 Kotaro Lives Alone (2022)
 Kōya no Shōnen Isamu (1973–1974)
 Kunimatsu-sama no Otoridai! (1971–1972)
 Kuroko's Basketball (2012–2015)
 Lady!!
 Lady Lady!! (1987—1988)
 Hello! Lady Lynn (1988—1989)
 Land of the Lustrous (2017)
 The Laughing Salesman
 The Laughing Salesman (1989—1992)
 The Laughing Salesman NEW (2017)
 Legend of Heavenly Sphere Shurato (1989—1990)
 Leo the Lion (1966–1967)
 Levius (2019–present)
 Little Pollon (1982—1983)
 Little Wansa (1973)
 Love and Lies (2017)
 Love Me, My Knight (1983—1984)
 Lupin the Third
 Lupin the 3rd Part I: The Classic Adventures (1971–1972)
 Lupin the 3rd Part II (1977–1980)
 Lupin the 3rd Part III: The Pink Jacket Adventures (1984–1985)
 Lupin the Third: The Woman Called Fujiko Mine (2012)
 Lupin the 3rd Part IV: The Italian Adventure (2015–2016)
 Lupin the 3rd Part V: Misadventures in France (2018)
 Lupin the 3rd Part 6 (2021–2022)
 Made in Abyss (2017)
 Magi: The Labyrinth of Magic (2012–2013)
 Magi: Adventure of Sinbad (2016)
 Magical Circle Guru Guru
 Magical Circle Guru Guru (1994—1995)
 Doki Doki Legend Magical Circle Guru Guru (2000)
 Magical Circle Guru Guru (2017)
 Magical Girl Site (2018)
 Magical Hat (1989—1990)
 Magical Taruruto (1988-1992)
 Maid Sama (2010)
 Maison Ikkoku (1986—1988)
 Mama Loves the Poyopoyo-Saurus (1995—1996)
 Mama wa Shōgaku 4 Nensei (1992)
 Mami the Psychic (1987–1989)
 Mamoette Shugogetten (1998—1999)
 Manmaru The Ninja Penguin (1997—1998)
 March Comes In like a Lion (2016–2018)
 MAR (2005–2007)
 Marmalade Boy (1994–1995)
 The Marshmallow Times (2004—2005)
 Marude Dameo (1991—1992)
 Marvelous Melmo (1971—1972)
 Master Keaton (1998—1999)
 Master of Mosquiton (1996–1997)
 Mazinger Z (1972–1974)
 Megalo Box (2018)
 Mew Mew Power (2002–2003)
 Microman: The Small Giant (1999)
 Miami Guns (2000)
 Microid S (1973)
 Midori Days (2004)
 Midori no Makibaō (1996—1997)
 Mikan Enikki (1992—1993)
 Miracle Giants Dome-kun (1989—1990)
 Mirai Keisatsu Urashiman (1983)
 Miss Machiko (1981—1983)
 Mister Ajikko (1987—1989)
 Mix (2019—present)
 Miyuki (1983—1984)
 Mizuiro Jidai (1996—1997) 
 Mob Psycho 100 (2016–present)
 Mobile Suit Gundam-san (2014)
 Mojacko (1995—1997)
 Mon Colle Knights (2000)
 Monkey Turn
 Monkey Turn (2004)
 Monkey Turn V (2004)
 Monster (2004—2005)
 The Monster Kid (1968–1969, 1980–1982)
 Mōretsu Atarō (1969—1970, 1990)
 Mr. Tonegawa: Middle Management Blues (2018)
 Musashi no Ken (1985—1986)
 Mushishi (2005–2016, 2014)
 My Girlfriend is Shobitch (2015–2019)
 My Hero Academia (2016–present)
 My Love Story!! (2015)
 My Monster Secret (2015)
 The Mythical Detective Loki Ragnarok (2003)
 Nagasarete Airantō (2007)
 Nana (2006—2007)
 Nangoku Shōnen Papuwa-kun (1992—1993, 2003—2004)
 Naruto (2002–2017)
 Natsume's Book of Friends (2005–presemt)
 Neighborhood Story (1995–1996)
 Neuro: Supernatural Detective (2007—2008)
 The New Adventures of Gigantor (1980–1981)
 The New Adventures of Kimba The White Lion (1989–1990)
 The New Adventures of Speed Racer (1993)
 New Cutie Honey (1994–1995)
 NieA under 7 - domestic poor @nimation (2000)
 Ninja Hattori-kun
 Ninja Hattori-kun (1981–1987)
 Ninja Hattori-kun Returns (2013–present)
 Ninku (1995—1996)
 Nintama Rantarō (1993—present)
 Nisekoi (2014–2015)
 No Guns Life (2019–present)
 Nono-chan (2001—2002)
 Noragami (2015)
 Norakuro
 Norakuro (1970—1971)
 Norakuro-kun (1987—1988)
 Nura: Rise of the Yokai Clan (2010)
 Nurse Angel Ririka SOS (1995—1996)
 Obake no Q-Tarō
 Obake no Q-Tarō (1965—1967)
 Shin Obake no Q-Tarō (1971—1972)
 Obake no Q-Tarō (1985—1987)
 Oh! Family (1986—1987)
 Ohayō! Spank (1981—1982)
 Oishinbo (1988—1992)
 Ojamanga Yamada-kun (1980—1982)
 One Piece (1999–present)
 One-Punch Man (2015–present)
 The Ones Within (2019–present)
 Ore wa Teppei (1977—1978)
 Osomatsu-kun
 Osomatsu-kun (1966–1967)
 Osomatsu-kun (1988–1989)
 Mr. Osomatsu (2015—2021)
 Ouran High School  Host Club (2006)
 Outlaw Star (1998)
 Pandora in the Crimson Shell: Ghost Urn (2016)
Parasyte -the maxim- (2014—2015)
 Patalliro!
 Boku Patalliro! (1982—1983)
 Patalliro! Saiyuki (2005)
 Patlabor: The TV Series (1989—1990)
 Peach Girl (2005)
 Perman (1965—1968, 1983—1985)
 Persia, the Magic Fairy (1984—1985)
 Pet Shop of Horrors (1999)
 Phantom Thief Jeanne (1999—2000)
 Phoenix (2004)
 Pita-Ten (2002)
 Plawres Sanshiro (1983—1984)
 Plunderer (2020—present)
 Poco's Udon World (2016)
 Pokonyan! (1993—1996)
 Pop Team Epic (2018)
 The Prince of Tennis (2001—2012)
 Princess Knight (1967—1968)
 Prison School (2015)
 The Promised Neverland (2019—present)
 Queen Millennia (1981—1982)
 The Qwaser of Stigmata
 The Qwaser of Stigmata (2010)
 The Qwaser of Stigmata II (2011)
 Rainbow: Nisha Rokubō no Shichinin (2010)
 Rainbow Sentai Robin (1966—1967)
 Ranma ½ (1989–1992)
 Rave Master (2001–2002)
 Ray the Animation (2006)
 Real Girl (2018—2019)
 Red Drive (2008)
 Reborn! (2006–2010)
 Record of Ragnarok (2021)
 Revolutionary Girl Utena (1997)
 Romantic Killer (2022)
 Ronin Warriors (1988–1989)
 The Rose of Versailles (1979—1980)
 Rurouni Kenshin (1996—1998)
 Sabu to Ichi Torimono Hikae (1968–1969)
 Saiki K. (2016–2018)
 Samurai Deeper Kyo (2002)
 Saiyuki (2000–2017)
 Sailor Moon
 Sailor Moon (1992–1997)
 Sailor Moon Crystal (2014–2016)
 Saint Seiya
 Saint Seiya (1986–1989)
 Saint Seiya: Hades (2002—2008)
 Saint Seiya: The Lost Canvas (2009—2011)
 Saint Seiya Omega (2012—2014) 
 Saint Seiya: Soul of Gold (2015)
 Saint Seiya: Saintia Shō (2018—2019)
 Knights of the Zodiac: Saint Seiya (2019—present)
 Sakigake!! Otokojuku (1988)
 Sally the Witch
 Sally the Witch (1966—1968)
 Sally the Witch 2 (1989—1991)
 Sarutobi Ecchan (1971—1972)
 Sasuga no Sarutobi (1982—1984)
 Sazae-san (1969—present)
 School Rumble
 School Rumble (2004—2005)
 School Rumble: 2nd Semester (2006)
 Scum's Wish (2017)
 Sennin Buraku (1963—1964)
 Seraph of the End (2015)
 The Seven Deadly Sins (2016)
 Sexy Commando Gaiden (1998)
 Sgt. Frog (2004—2011)
 Shaman King (2001–2002)
 Shaman King (2021–present)
 Shoot!
 Aoki Densetsu Shoot! (1993–1994)
 Shoot! Goal to the Future (2022–present)
 Silent Möbius (1998)
 Silver Fang -The Shooting Star Gin- (1986)
 Shura no Toki – Age of Chaos (2004)
 Slam Dunk (1993-1996)
 Snow White with the Red Hair (2015–2016)
 The Song of Tentomushi (1974–1976)
 Sora no Manimani (2009)
 Soul Eater (2008–2009)
 Soul Eater Not! (2014)
 Soul Hunter (1999)
 Soul Hunter (2018)
 Space Ace (1965—1966)
 Space Cobra (1982—1983)
 Space Pirate Captain Harlock (1978—1979)
 Speed Racer (1967–1968)
 Speed Racer: The Next Generation (2008–2013)
 Speed Racer X (1997)
 Spriggan (2022—present)
 Spy x Family (2022–present)
 Star of the Giants (1968–1971)
 Steel Angel Kurumi
 Steel Angel Kurumi (1999—2000) 
 Steel Angel Kurumi 2 (2001)
 Stop!! Hibari-kun! (1983—1984)
 Summer Time Rendering (2022)
 Suzuka (2005)
 Sword Gai: The Animation (2018)
 Tactics (2004–2005)
 Taishō Baseball Girls (2009)
 Take My Brother Away (2017–2019)
 Tasuke, the Samurai Cop (1990—1991)
 Teasing Master Takagi-san (2018–2019)
 Tenjho Tenge (2004)
 Tensai Bakabon
 Tensai Bakabon (1971—1972)
 Ganso Tensai Bakabon (1975—1977)
 Heisei Tensai Bakabon (1990)
 Rerere no Tensai Bakabon (1999—2000)
 Shinya! Tensai Bakabon (2018)
 Terra Formars (2014–2016)
 Thermae Romae (2012)
 Thermae Romae Novae (2022)
 This Art Club Has a Problem! (2016)
 This Ugly yet Beautiful World (2004)
 Those Who Hunt Elves
 Those Who Hunt Elves (1996)
 Those Who Hunt Elves 2 (1997)
 The Three-Eyed One (1990–1991)
 Tiger Mask
 Tiger Mask (1969—1971)
 Tiger Mask II (1981–1982)
 Tiger Mask W (2016–2017)
 To Your Eternity (2021–present)
 Toilet-Bound Hanako-kun (2020)
 Tokimeki Tonight (1982—1983)
 Tokko (2006)
 Tokyo Ghoul (2018)
 Tokyo Mew Mew
 Tokyo Mew Mew (2002–2003)
 Tokyo Mew Mew New (2022–present)
 Tokyo Revengers (2021)
 Tonde Burin (1994—1995)
 Tomorrow's Joe (1980–1981)
 Toriko (2011–2014)
 Tottemo! Luckyman (1994—1995) 
 Touch (1985—1987)
 Toward the Terra (2007)
 Trigun
 Trigun (1998)
 Trigun Stampede (2023–present)
 Triton of the Sea (2002)
 Tsuide ni Tonchinkan (1987—1988)
 Tsurupika Hagemaru (1988—1989)
 Ultimate Muscle (2002–2006)
 UFO Ultramaiden Valkyrie (2002–2006)
 Ultra B (1987—1989)
 Ultraman (2019–present)
 UQ Holder! (2017––2018)
 Urusei Yatsura (1981–1986)
 Vampire Knight (2008)
 Vampire Princess Miyu (1997—1998)
 Vinland Saga (2019–present)
 Violinist of Hameln (1996—1997)
 Virtual Hero (2018–2020)
 Wandering Sun (1971)
 The Way of the Househusband (2021–present)
 We Never Learn (2019)
 Wedding Peach (1995—1996)
 Welcome to the Ballroom (2017)
 What's Michael? (1988—1989)
 Whistle! (2002—2003)
 Wild 7 (2002)
 Wild Knights Gulkeeva (1995)
 World Trigger (2014—2022)
 Wotakoi: Love Is Hard for Otaku (2018—2021)
 X (2001—2002)
 xxxHolic (2006–2008)
 Yakyū-kyō no Uta (1977—1979)
 Yawara! A Fashionable Judo Girl! (1989—1992)
 Yoiko (1998—1999)
 You're Under Arrest
 You're Under Arrest (1996—1997)
 You're Under Arrest Special (1999)
 You're Under Arrest 2 (2001)
 You're Under Arrest: Full Throttle (2007–2008)
 Your Lie in April (2014–2015)
 Yowamushi Pedal (2013–2018)
 Yu-Gi-Oh! (1998–2002)
 Yu Yu Hakusho (1992–1994)
 YuruYuri (2011)
 Zatch Bell! (2003–2006)
 Zombie-Loan (2007)

Series about comics
 Alien Dawn (2013–2014) – Series about a boy investigating alien activity and conspiracy theories that inspired his missing father's comic book.
 Almost Heroes (2011) – Sitcom about two brothers running their late father's comic book store.
 American Horror Story: Cult (2017) – A part of the American Horror Story anthology.  It features the character Twisty the Clown in a comic book.
 A Pup Named Scooby-Doo (1988–1991) – Part of the Scooby-Doo franchise.  In the series, Scooby and Shaggy are fans of the comic book "Commander Cool and Mellow Mutt."  They often dress like the characters in the series.
 Are You Afraid of the Dark?: Curse of the Shadows (2020) – Jai, a member of the Midnight Society, is heavily into comic books.  His favorite book is "The Ghastly Grinner."
 Bakuman – Anime series about two teenage manga creators.
 Best.Worst.Weekend.Ever. (2018) – A group of teenagers attempt to sneak into a comic book convention to show their homemade comic book to their favorite comic book author.
 Big Bad Beetleborgs (1996–1998) – A group of kids are transformed into their favorite comic book superheroes.
 The Big Bang Theory (2007–2019) – Most of the main characters are comic book fans.  Nearly every episode references comic books.
 Bless the Harts (2019–present) – One of the main characters, Violet Hart, is an aspiring artist who makes her own comics.
 Blood Ties (2007) – The main protagonist, Henry Fitzroy, works as a graphic novelist.
 Bob (1992–1993) – Sitcom about a comic book creator.
 The Bureau of Magical Things (2018–present) – One of the main characters, Peter, is a comic book fan.
 The Cape (2011) – An honest cop becomes a superhero based on his son's favorite comic book character.
 Caroline in the City (1995–1999) – Sitcom about a comic strip artist.
 The Casagrandes (2019–2022) – Like its predecessor, The Loud House, the series' background art is heavily influenced by comic strips.
 The Comic Artist and His Assistants: The Animation (2014) – Anime about a manga author.
 Comic Book Men (2012–2018) – A reality TV series centering on Jay and Silent Bob's Secret Stash: a comic book store owned by filmmaker Kevin Smith.
 Comic Girls (2018) – Anime about a group of girls determined to make the best manga.
 Comic Party (2001) – Anime about two friends who visit a Comic Party Convention. 
 Comic Party Revolution (2005) - Sequel to Comic Party.
 Comic Store Heroes (2012) – Reality series setting in Midtown Comics.
 The Comic Strip (1987) – Animated series featuring segments of original cartoons in the form of a comic strip.
 Con Man (2015–2017) – Web comedy about a struggling actor eking out a living by attending comic book conventions.
 Corner Gas (2004–2009) – The main character is an avid comic book fan.
 Creepshow (2019) – Horror anthology centering on a comic book.
 Dark Oracle (2004–2006) – Teen drama centering on a comic book.
 Detention (1999–2000) – One of the main characters, Jim Kim, is an obsessed comic book fan.  He references comic books in each episode.
 Doug (1991–1999) – The main protagonist, Doug, aspires to be a comic book artist.  He draws his own comic book featuring his alter-ego, Quilman.
 The Epic Tales of Captain Underpants (2018–present) – Series about two boys who make their own comics.  They hypnotize their principal into becoming their comic creation.
 Fairly OddParents (2001–2017) – The series features a reoccurring character, the Crimson Chin: a comic book superhero.
 Fanboy & Chum Chum (2009–2012) – Animated series about two comic book fans.
 Geeking Out (2016) – Series exploring comic books and other forms of nerd culture.
 Groovie Goolies (1970–1972) – Animated series featuring Archie Comics' Sabrina Spellman as a supporting character.
 Heroes (2006–2010) – Series told in the form of a comic book.
 Heroes Reborn (2015) – Series told in the form of a comic book.
 Hey Dude (1989–1991) – One of the ranchers, Buddy, is a fan of comics.  Another rancher, Danny, makes his own comic strip.
 High School USA! (2013–2015) – Parody of Archie Comics.
 The Imperfects (2022) – One of the main characters, Juan Ruiz, is a graphic novelist.
 Junji Ito Maniac: Japanese Tales of the Macabre (2023) – Series with episodes adapted from manga by artist Junji Ito.
 Kid Cosmic (2020) – Animated series about a comic book fan who becomes a superhero.  The format is inspired by comic books.
 Kirk (1995–1997) – Sitcom about an illustrator taking care of his family.
 The Loud House (2016–present)– The main character, Lincoln Loud, is an avid comic book fan.  The series' background art is heavily inspired by comic strips.
 Masters of Horror (2005–2007)– The episode, Jenifer, is based on a story from the horror comic Creepy by Bruce Jones and Bernie Wrightson.
 McGee and Me! (1989–1995) – Series about an aspiring cartoonist having adventures with his creation while growing in his Christian faith.
 Mighty Med (2013–2015) – Sitcom about two teenaged comic fans who work as doctors in a superhero hospital.
 Mission Hill (1999–2002) – Animated sitcom about an aspiring cartoonist who lives with his teenaged brother in a big city-loft.
 Monthly Girls' Nozaki-kun (2014) - A high school girl falls for a manga artist.
 My Secret Identity (1988–1991) – The main character, Andrew Clements, is an avid comic fan.
 My Wife and Kids (2001–2005) – One of the main characters, Junior, is heavily involved with comic books.
 Once a Hero (1987) – Series about a comic book superhero coming to life.
 Project Mc2 (2015–2017) – One of the main characters, Devon D'Marco, is a graphic novelist.
 Queer as Folk (2000–2005) – One of the characters, Michael Novotny is an avid comic book fan.  He reads comics, attends conventions, and eventually owns a comic store and writes his own comic.
 The Real Ghostbusters - (1986–1991) – One of the main characters, Ray Stantz, is a comic book fan.  His favorite comic book character is the superhero, Captain Steel, who was featured in two episodes.
 Recess (1997–2001) – The main characters are fans of the comic book Senor Fusion.
 Re:Creators (2017) – Anime series about comic characters coming to life.
 The Replacements (2006–2009) – Two orphans use an ad in a comic book to replace things.
 Rocko's Modern Life (1993–1996) – The main protagonist, Rocko, works at a comic book shop.
 Roseanne (1988–2018) – Two of the main characters, David Healy and Darlene Conner, were graphic novelists.  David was the artist and Darlene was the writer.
 Thus Spoke Kishibe Rohan (2020) – Anime series about an eccentric manga artist.
 Thus Spoke Kishibe Rohan (2020) – Live-action series about an eccentric manga artist.
 The Simpsons (1989–present) – The series features a reoccurring character, Comic Book Guy.  He is a comic book collector who owns the local comic book store.  He often criticizes and references comic books.
 Tear Along the Dotted Line (2021) – Animated sitcom about a cartoonist in Rome and an imaginary armadillo.  The series is created by comic artist Zerocalcare. 
 The Troop (2009–2013) – One of the main characters is an aspiring comic artist.
 Utopia (2013–2014) – Sci-fi series centering on a group of fans discovering that their favorite comic book is based on reality.
 Utopia (2020) – Series based on the British television series of the same name.  The series centers on a group of comic book fans.
 Warped! (2022) – Sitcom centered in a comic book store.
 We Baby Bears (2022) – Prequel to the series We Bare Bears, which is based on a webcomic.
 Woke (2020–2022) – Sitcom about a black comic book artist whose perception on life is changed after being unjustly assaulted by policemen.  The series is also based on a comic strip.
 Yashahime: Princess Half-Demon (2020–present) – Sequel to the series Inuyasha. which is based on a manga.
 Young Sheldon (2017–present) – Two characters, Sheldon Cooper and Tam Nguyen, are comic fans.  They shop at a store called "Big City Comix" where Sheldon's sister, Missy, eventually works.
 Zero (2021) – Omar, the male lead protagonist, is an aspiring manga artist.

See also
 List of comic-based television episodes directed by women
 List of superhero television series
 List of television programs based on video games
 List of comics based on television programs
 List of films based on comics
 List of films based on comic strips

References

List
Television programs
Comics